Timothy Essex (1765?–1847) was an English composer.

Life
Essex was born in or about 1765 at Coventry, Warwickshire, the son of Timothy Essex there; Margaret Essex was his sister. He began playing on the flute and violin at age 13, for his own amusement, and his father let him study music as a profession. In 1786 he established himself as a teacher of the pianoforte, organ, and flute. In order to better his position he matriculated at Oxford as a member of Magdalen Hall 10 December 1806, and took the degree of bachelor of music on the following 17 December. He proceeded doctor of music 2 December 1812.

Essex was known as a teacher, and obtained some popularity as a composer. His 'Musical Academy' was at 38 Hill Street, Berkeley Square; he was also organist, composer to, and director of the choir of St George's Chapel, Albemarle Street. He died 27 September 1847, aged 82, in York Buildings, New Road, London.

Works
Among his works are:

 Eight English Canzonetts for a Single Voice (1800).
 A Grand Military Sonata for the Pianoforte, with an accompaniment ad libitum for a violin (1800). 
 Six Duets for Flutes or Violins (1801?). 
 Eight Lessons and Four Sonatinas on a Peculiar Plan, intended to establish a proper method of fingering on the pianoforte (1802). 
 Six Canzonets, the words from the poems of the late Mrs. Robinson (1804). 
 Introduction and Fugue for the Organ (1812). 
 Harmonia Sacra. being a collection of sacred melodies for the 150 Psalms of David (1830?).

Essex also published a set of slow and quick marches for the pianoforte, with the full scores added for a military band, a variety of rondos for the pianoforte, and pianoforte and flute, and many single songs.

References

Attribution

1765 births
1847 deaths
18th-century British composers
18th-century British male musicians
19th-century British composers
Musicians from Coventry
English composers
English flautists
English violinists
British male violinists
British music educators
Alumni of Magdalen Hall, Oxford
19th-century English educators
18th-century English musicians
19th-century English musicians
19th-century British male musicians